I Want to Live (Spanish: Quiero vivir) is a 1953 Mexican crime film directed by Alberto Gout and starring Jorge Mistral, Meche Barba and Julio Villarreal.

The film's sets were designed by Manuel Fontanals.

Cast
 Jorge Mistral as Rubén Iturbe  
 Meche Barba as Mercedes Rios  
 Julio Villarreal as Comandante Rodolfo Saldívar  
 Víctor Alcocer as Ángel  
 Lupe Llaca as Alicia  
 Celia Viveros as Angélica  
 Roberto Galvez as El ronco Gómez  
 Charles Rooner as Doctor  
 Alberto Mariscal as Secuaz de Ángel  
 Andrea Palma as Andrea 
 Daniel Arroyo as Invitado a fiesta  
 Manuel de la Vega as Tomás  
 Enrique Díaz Indiano as Samuel, mayordomo  
 Salvador Godínez as Esbirro de Ángel  
 Álvaro Matute as Agente de policía 
 Ángel Merino as Agente de policía 
 Luis Mussot hijo as Manuel  
 Salvador Quiroz as Invitado a fiesta  
 Acela Vidaurri as Clara, empleada cabaret

References

Bibliography 
 María Luisa Amador. Cartelera cinematográfica, 1950–1959. UNAM, 1985.

External links 
 

1953 films
1953 crime films
Mexican crime films
1950s Spanish-language films
Films directed by Alberto Gout
Mexican black-and-white films
1950s Mexican films